Abderrachid Boukerzaza (born April 19, 1955) in Chahna, Algeria, is Minister of Communication in Algeria. He was selected by Abdelaziz Bouteflika who appointed seven new government ministers. They replaced individuals who are closely  associated with former Algerian prime minister, Ali Benflis, Bouteflika's rival.

Education and previous occupations

Boukerzaza earned a B.S. in Physics Chemistry at the University of Constantine in June 1978. In 1982 he obtained an advanced degree in chemistry
from the same institution. He was a professor at the University of Constantine from 1977 - 1986.

He served as secretary general of the UNJA from 1986 - 1999, was a member of the central committee of the FLN from 1986 - 1998,
and a deputy with the national popular parliament 1997 - 2002. Boukerzaza is a former minister of territorial development & environment 
in charge of city.

References

1955 births
Living people
National Liberation Front (Algeria) politicians
Government ministers of Algeria
Members of the People's National Assembly
21st-century Algerian people